After the Ceiling Cracked is a multi-format set released by post-metal band Pelican. It features Pelican’s London live set from December 20, 2005, interviews and live bonus material shot at various stops on the band’s past US tours, a video for “Autumn Into Summer,” and an extensive photo gallery.

Live material from Scala was shot by British-based outfit Muckspreader Productions.
Also included is a 3" audio CD containing two versions of the song “Pink Mammoth” (a major key reworking of the Untitled EP track “Mammoth”) — one of which features all the members of Seattle group These Arms Are Snakes — and “End of Seasons,” a Prefuse 73 remix medley of “Aurora Borealis,” and the untitled track from The Fire in Our Throats Will Beckon the Thaw.

Track listing
DVD Content: Live from Scala, King's Cross, London, December 20, 2005:

March Into the Sea
Autumn Into Summer
NightEndDay
Last Day of Winter
Aurora Borealis
Sirius
Australasia

Live Footage Collection 2003-2006:

"Sirius" (interview w/ Larry and Laurent) "NightEndDay" and "City of Echoes" live from Neumo's Crystal Ball, Seattle, WA 06/03/06
"Pink Mammoth" and extra footage live from The Troubadour, Los Angeles 05/29/06
"Last Day of Winter" live from Nanci Raygun, Richmond, VA 05/12/06
"GW" live from Sabalas, Portland, OR 08/13/05
"Mammoth," Drought," and "Red Ran Amber" live from The Nyabinghi, Youngstown, OH 05/30/04
"Forecast for Today" and "The Woods" live from The Nyabinghi, Youngstown, OH 10/11/03
"Autumn Into Summer" music video

Photo and art gallery:

Photos and posters from all eras of the band

3" CD Content:

Pink Mammoth
End of Seasons (Prefuse 73 Remix)
These Arms are Pink Mammoths (the song "Pink Mammoth" featuring These Arms Are Snakes for additional musical support)

References

Pelican (band) albums
2008 compilation albums
Hydra Head Records compilation albums
2008 live albums
Live video albums
2008 video albums
Hydra Head Records video albums
Pelican (band) video albums